Denjan (also Romanized as Denjān) is a village in Kushk-e Hezar Rural District, Beyza District, Sepidan County, Fars Province, Iran. At the 2006 census, its population was 96, in 26 families.

References 

Populated places in Beyza County